The  is a Japanese railway line connecting Isahaya Station, Isahaya and Shimabarakō. The line parallels the coast of Shimabara Peninsula, Nagasaki Prefecture. The third-sector railway company Shimabara Railway owns the line and also operates buses and ships. The first section of the line opened in 1911. The former line between Shimabarakō and Kazusa had few passengers and closed on 1 April 2008. The line uses the older diesel-powered Kiha 20 type train which was developed in the mid-1950s. Because of the line's vintage trains which maintain the old Japanese National Railways colors of red and beige, it remains popular among train enthusiasts. This is the only railway on Kyushu outside the Fukuoka area that has remained privately throughout its history.

History
The Shimabara Railway Co. opened the Isahaya – Aino section in 1911, extending the line to Kojiromachi in 1912 and Minami-Shimabara the following year.

The Kuchinotsu Railway Co. opened the Minami-Shimabara – Dozaki section in 1922, extending the line to Harajo in 1926 and Kazusa two years later.

Diesel power was introduced by the Kuchinotsu Railway Co. in 1930, and by the Shimabara Railway Co. in 1934. In 1943 the two companies merged under the name Shimabara Railway Co.

In 1958 direct services to/from Nagasaki were introduced, operating until 1980.

Former connecting lines
 The Hizen Obama Railway Co. opened a 17 km line from Aino station to Unzen Obama between 1923 and 1927. Direct services from the Shimabara line operated from 1927 until 1932. The line closed in 1938.

Volcanic disruptions
Services were disrupted for six months in 1991 owing to lava flows from Mount Unzen, which also caused a one-month service disruption the following year.

In 1993 a major lava flow forced the closure of the line between Shimabarakō and Fukae, and services did not resume on that section until 1997.

The Shimabarakō – Kazusa section was closed on 1 April 2008 owing to declining patronage.

Stations

●：Always stops   ▲：Sometimes stops   ｜：Does not stop

See also
List of railway companies in Japan
List of railway lines in Japan

References
This article incorporates material from the corresponding article in the Japanese Wikipedia

Route diagram:

External links 
 Shimatetsu official website

Railway lines in Japan
Rail transport in Nagasaki Prefecture
Railway lines opened in 1911
1067 mm gauge railways in Japan
1911 establishments in Japan
Japanese third-sector railway lines